Keshia Chantay Baker (born January 30, 1988 in Fairfield, California) is an American track and field athlete. She competed at the 2012 Summer Olympics in the 4 × 400 m relay event, running in the heats and winning a gold medal.

While running for her home town Fairfield High School, she finished third in the 400 meters at the 2006 CIF California State Meet.  She had been a finalist the previous two years.  Then she ran for the University of Oregon.  At the 2010 NCAA Championships, she anchored Oregon's winning 4x400 relay team to victory, while finishing fourth in the open 400 meters.  Earlier in the season, she was runner up in 400 meters at the NCAA Indoor Championships, both times behind future Olympic teammate Francena McCorory.

References

Living people
1988 births
American female sprinters
Athletes (track and field) at the 2012 Summer Olympics
Olympic gold medalists for the United States in track and field
People from Fairfield, California
Medalists at the 2012 Summer Olympics
Sportspeople from the San Francisco Bay Area
Oregon Ducks women's track and field athletes
Track and field athletes from California
World Athletics Championships winners
Olympic female sprinters
21st-century American women